Launcelot Brown (13 January 1748 – 28 February 1802) was an English politician.

He was a Member (MP) of the Parliament of England for Totnes from 1780 to 1784.

References

1748 births
1802 deaths
Members of the Parliament of Great Britain for Totnes
British MPs 1780–1784